The Felipe Chaves House, at 325 Lala St. in Belen, New Mexico, was built around 1860.  It was listed on the National Register of Historic Places in 1980.  The listing included two contributing buildings.

It is a fine example of Territorial Style.

References

Chaves, Felipe, House
National Register of Historic Places in Valencia County, New Mexico
Houses completed in 1860